The 1982–83 Nationalliga A season was the 45th season of the Nationalliga A, the top level of ice hockey in Switzerland. Eight teams participated in the league, and EHC Biel won the championship.

First round

Final round

Relegation

External links
 Championnat de Suisse 1982/83

Swiss
National League (ice hockey) seasons
1982–83 in Swiss ice hockey